Pyrgiscus altenai is a species of sea snail, a marine gastropod mollusk in the family Pyramidellidae, the pyrams and their allies.

References

 van Aartsen J.J. & Corgan J.X. (1996) South African pyramidellacean gastropod names. Basteria 60: 153-160

External links
 To World Register of Marine Species

Pyramidellidae
Gastropods described in 1996